Special Forces Group may refer to:
 Special Forces Group (Australia)
 Special Forces Group (Belgium)
 Special Forces Group (Guinea)
 Special Forces Group (Japan)
 Individual groups within the Special Forces (United States Army)

See also 
 Special Operations Group (disambiguation)
 Special Forces Command (disambiguation)

ko:특수작전군